Ambra Danon is an Italian costume designer. She was nominated for the Academy Award for Best Costume Design for his work in the film La Cage aux Folles (1978).

External links 

Italian costume designers
Year of birth missing
Possibly living people
Accademia Nazionale di Arte Drammatica Silvio D'Amico alumni